Buyeo County (Buyeo-gun) is a county in South Chungcheong Province, South Korea. Buyeo-eup, the county's capital, was the site of the capital of Baekje from 538-660 AD, during which it was called Sabi Fortress.

Famous people associated with Buyeo County in more recent times include noted stem-cell researcher Hwang Woo-suk.

Geography
Buyeo is located at the southern area of Chungcheongnam-do, the heart of the Korean peninsula.

During the Three Kingdoms Era, the capital of Baekje was moved to present-day Buyeo-eup (then called Sabi) on account of crowding in the former capital, which was near present-day Seoul. A fortress called Garimseong was constructed for defending the new capital. Buyeo County has numerous historical sites from this era, such as the mountain fortresses (sanseong) at Seongheung, Buso, and Cheong, the tumuli at Neungsan-ri, and the temple site at Gunsu-ri, all designated Historic Sites of South Korea.

Climate

Baekje Cultural Festival
Buyeo County held its first Baekje cultural festival in 1955 celebrating the history of ancient Baekje and the culture that blossomed in the Buyeo area, sponsored by the residents of Buyeo County themselves. The province began

From 1965, the province officially announced to take place Baekje cultural memorial.

The festival showcases traditional costumes and marching from the Baekje era, focusing on the works of the six kings of the Sabi era and the story of the loyalty of three subjects. This festival was ranked among the best in the country in 2007.

Sister cities

 Gangdong, Seoul
 Gangnam, Seoul
 Luoyang, Henan, China
 Asuka, Nara, Japan

See also
 List of Baekje-related topics
 Geography of South Korea
 Chungcheong
Five storied stone pagoda of Jeongnimsa Temple site:located in Buyeo

References

External links
 County government website

 
Baekje
Counties of South Chungcheong Province